Richard Cox (21 April 1830 – 27 March 1865) was an Australian cricketer who played for Tasmania. He was born in Hobart and died in Fingal.

Cox made a single first-class appearance for the side, during the 1853–54 season, against Victoria. In the only innings in which he batted, he scored 34 runs.

See also
 List of Tasmanian representative cricketers

External links
Richard Cox at CricketArchive 

1830 births
1865 deaths
Australian cricketers
Tasmania cricketers
Cricketers from Hobart